Kaynte is a small village in the Gujrat District of Gujrat tehsil, province of Punjab,
Pakistan.

Politics
Kante's leader of the union council is Aalam Garh.

References

Populated places in Gujrat District